Anne-Adrien-Armand Durantin, also called Armand de Villevert, (4 April 1818 – 30 December 1891) was a 19th-century French playwright and novelist.

Biography 
First a lawyer, Durantin turned to literature and collaborated with the France littéraire and the Echo français as well as with other magazines. He then began to write theatre plays but success remained modest until the day the Théâtre du Gymnase announced a comedy in four acts, without the author's name, entitled Heloise Paranquet. How Montigny, then director of the Gymnase, had mounted this play aroused public attention. The success the play obtained, thanks to the skilful handling of dramatic situations, had critics trying to find who the author was, a name that the Cabinet littéraire soon unveiled. Only later was it learned that Durantin had benefited the collaboration of Alexandre Dumas fils. Durantin also injected his legal expertise in this play, but when he tried to repeat the feat with Thérèse Humbert two years later, the public did not follow him.

Among his novels, the Carnet d'un libertin, whose hero succumbs to a terrible disease after having exhausted all the debauchery, has the particularity of featuring the "scientific monstrosities" of musée Dupuytren.

A Parisisan street in the Montmartre area, has been named after him since 1881.

Publications 
Theatre
1840: La Guimard, one-act comedy, mingled with couplets, Paris, Théâtre du Panthéon, 16 June
1840: L'Auberge du crime, ou les Canards, one-act vaudeville, with Théophile Deyeux,  Théâtre du Panthéon, 13 December
1842: Les Amours d'un rat, one-act vaudeville, with Jules de Rieux, Théâtre du Panthéon, 21 February
1843: Un déshonneur posthume, one-act comedy, in verse, Second Théâtre-Français, 15 March
1843: Un tour de roulette, comedy in 1 act and in prose, with Jules de Rieux, Second Théâtre-Français, 27 March
1843: L'Italien et le bas-breton, ou la Confusion des langues, one-act comédie en vaudeville, Théâtre du Gymnase-Dramatique, 18 November
1844: L'Oncle à succession, two-act comédie en vaudeville, Théâtre du Gymnase-Dramatique, 20 March
1846: Le Serpent sous l'herbe, one-act comédie en vaudeville, Théâtre du Gymnase-Dramatique, 10 June
1846: Les Spéculateurs, five-act drama, in prose, with Émile Fontaine, Théâtre-Français, 27 June
1848: Le Mariage par procuration, one-act comédie en vaudeville, with Raymond Deslandes, Théâtre du Vaudeville, 8 June
1849: Les Viveurs de la Maison d'Or, two-act comedy, in prose, with Louis Monrose, Second Théâtre-Français, 7 March
1849: La Mort de Strafford, five-act drama, Second Théâtre-Français, 8 March
1850: Les Trois Racan, one-act comedy, drawn from Tallemand Des Réaux's memoirs, with Raymond Deslandes, Théâtre-Historique, 25 June
1852: Les Gaîtés champêtres, two-act comédie-vaudeville, after Jules Janin, with Charles Desnoyer and Léon Guillard, Théâtre du Vaudeville, 3 July
1853: La Terre promise, three-act comédie en vaudeville, with Raymond Deslandes, Théâtre du Vaudeville, 24 January
1855: La Femme d'un grand homme, five-act comedy, in prose, with Raymond Deslandes, Second Théâtre-Français, 5 February
1858: Monsieur Acker, one-act comedy, Théâtre du Gymnase-Dramatique, 15 August
1859: Les Comédiens de salons, one-act caricature, with Auguste Anicet-Bourgeois, Théâtre du Vaudeville, 18 March
1866: Héloïse Paranquet, four-act play, Théâtre du Gymnase, 20 JanuaryText online
1868: Thérèse Humbert, three-act comedy, Théâtre du Gymnase, 19 October
1875: Une pêche miraculeuse, two-acty comedy, with Eugène Nus, Théâtre du Vaudeville, 11 March
Novels and varia
1863: La Légende de l'homme éternel Text online
1864: Domaine de la couronne. Palais de Saint-Cloud, résidence impériale, with Philippe de Saint-Albin Text online
1873: L'Héritage de la folie
1874: Mariage de prêtre
1879: Le Carnet d'un libertin Text online
1879: L'Halluciné
1879: L'Excommunié Text online
1879: Un jésuite de robe courte
1882: Histoire d'Héloïse Paranquet et manuscrit primitif ayant servi à M. Alexandre Dumas pour retoucher la pièce que lui a portée M. Armand Durantin et qui s'appelait alors « Mademoiselle de Breuil »
1885: Le Carnaval de Nice
1889: Un élève des Jésuites

Distinctions 
 Chevalier of the Légion d'honneur (9 August 1870 decree)

References

Sources 
Pierre Larousse, Grand Dictionnaire universel du XIXe siècle, vol. VI, 1870, 
Gustave Vapereau, Dictionnaire universel des contemporains, Hachette, Paris, 1880, 
 

19th-century French novelists
19th-century French dramatists and playwrights
Chevaliers of the Légion d'honneur
People from Senlis
1818 births
1892 deaths